The Voice of Christmas: The Complete Decca Christmas Songbook is a two-disc collection of Christmas music recorded by Bing Crosby for the Decca label between 1935 and 1956, released by Universal Music Group on October 6, 1998. Crosby was the first popular singer to record Christmas songs, and his 1942 recording of "White Christmas" for the movie Holiday Inn is the best-selling single of all time. The most prolific period for his Christmas recordings was between 1942 and 1955, including his Christmas songs recorded with The Andrews Sisters. Crosby continued to record Christmas titles for other labels later in his career.

Content
Most of the tracks included were originally issued on 78 RPM records. This collection contains all of Crosby's Decca label Christmas recordings, including some duplications of titles recorded at different times. The 1947 recording of "White Christmas" is the most played and considered the "standard" version; this re-recording was made due to the acetate of the 1942 version, and its flip side "Silent Night," becoming too degraded in quality to reproduce further copies.

Tracks are presented in loose chronological order, with collaborations appearing in chronological order on disc two from tracks nine through twenty. Two tracks are previously unreleased songs: an alternate version of his original May 29, 1942, recording of "White Christmas"; and a February 21, 1935, recording of "Silent Night." The 1935 version of "Silent Night" was not released due to Crosby's feelings that a popular entertainer should not profit on such a religion-based song; however, once the proceeds were arranged to be donated to charity, a second recording of the song was released as a single in 1935 and was later packaged as part of a 1940 album.

Track listing
Disc one

Disc two

See also
Holiday Inn (film)
White Christmas (soundtrack)
White Christmas (film)
The Andrews Sisters

References

Bing Crosby compilation albums
Christmas compilation albums
1998 Christmas albums
Christmas albums by American artists
Pop Christmas albums
Decca Records compilation albums